Fərzili (also, Farzali, Fərzəli, Farzuli and Farzuly) is a village and municipality in the Jalilabad Rayon of Azerbaijan.  It has a population of 657.

References 

Populated places in Jalilabad District (Azerbaijan)